Robert Fisher may refer to:

Politicians

 Robert Fisher (MP) (1465–1535), in 1529 MP for Rochester
 Robert F. Fisher (1879–1969), member of the California legislature
 Robert Fisher (Tennessee politician) (1925–1989), American politician expelled from the Tennessee legislature
 Robert Fisher (New Hampshire politician), member of the New Hampshire legislature 2014–2017

Artists and musicians
 Robert Fisher (playwright) (1922–2008), American playwright
 Robert M. Fisher (1928–2007), American artist
 Rob Fisher (British musician) (1956–1999), British keyboardist and songwriter
 Robert Fisher (c.1957–2017), American vocalist and songwriter from Willard Grant Conspiracy
 Rob Fisher (conductor), American music director, conductor, arranger and pianist

Others
 Robert Fisher (priest) (fl. 1490s – 1510s), Canon of Windsor
 Robert Fisher (UK academic) (born 1943), interest in teaching philosophy to children
 Robert Fisher (university president) (born c. 1948), president of Belmont University
 Robert Fisher (journalist) (born 1948/49), Canadian radio and television journalist
 Robert J. Fisher (born 1954), American business manager and director of Gap Inc
 Robert Joseph Fisher (born 1959), American priest of the Catholic Church
 Robert William Fisher (born 1961), American fugitive
 Rob Fisher (motorcyclist) (fl. 1990s), British motorcycle racer
 Rob Fisher (barrister), New Zealand lawyer

See also
 Bob Fisher (disambiguation)
 Robert Fischer (disambiguation)